The Stone Merchant is a 2006 Italian thriller-drama film produced, written and directed by Renzo Martinelli and starring Harvey Keitel. It is based on the novel Ricordati di dimenticarla by Corrado Calabrò.

Plot

Ludovico Vicedomini is a charming and charismatic dealer who sells precious stones in Europe and the Middle East. But behind his pleasant appearance, he hides a big secret. Along with his business partner Shahid, he plans a terrorist attack on a large scale.

With the conspiracy almost ready, Ludovico meets Alceo and beautiful Leda, a married couple who enjoy holidays in Turkey. They do not suspect they are participating in a mysterious and deadly game with Ludovico and his partner.

However, fate takes hold of Ludovico, who becomes infatuated with Leda. She, receiving a precious ring from the merchant, must now choose between her husband and the mysterious man who fell in love with her.

Cast 
  
Harvey Keitel as Ludovico Vicedomini 
Jane March as  Leda 
Jordi Mollà as  Alceo 
F. Murray Abraham as  Shahid 
 Bruno Bilotta as  Libero 
Lucilla Agosti as  Lidia 
 Federica Martinelli as Rita 
Jonis Bashir as The Somali Terrorist

References

External links

2006 thriller drama films
2006 films
Italian thriller drama films
Films directed by Renzo Martinelli
Films about terrorism
2000s Italian-language films
2000s Italian films